The Exhibition of Lyon, themed "Rural Habitat" was a Specialised Expo recognised by the Bureau International des Expositions.

External links
Official website of the BIE

World's fairs in Lyon
1949 in France
History of Lyon